Tapinoscaris is a genus of beetles in the family Carabidae, containing the following species:

 Tapinoscaris carnoti (Alluaud, 1930)
 Tapinoscaris chaudoiri (Harold, 1879)
 Tapinoscaris descarpentriesi Basilewsky, 1971
 Tapinoscaris peyrierasi Basilewsky, 1976
 Tapinoscaris raffrayi (Fairmaire, 1884)
 Tapinoscaris razananae (Alluaud, 1924)
 Tapinoscaris rugatula Jeannel, 1946
 Tapinoscaris rugulicollis (Fairmaire, 1887)
 Tapinoscaris tricostis (Fairmaire, 1869)
 Tapinoscaris variolosa (Alluaud, 1930)

References

Scaritinae